Jerzy Gros (21 February 1945 – 17 January 2018) was a Polish long-distance runner. He competed in the marathon at the 1976 Summer Olympics.

References

1945 births
2018 deaths
Athletes (track and field) at the 1976 Summer Olympics
Polish male long-distance runners
Polish male marathon runners
Olympic athletes of Poland
Sportspeople from Chorzów